Redon Agglomération is a French intercommunal structure centred on the city of Redon. It is located in the departments Morbihan, Ille-et-Vilaine and Loire-Atlantique, in the regions Brittany and Pays de la Loire, northwestern France. It was created in April 1996. Its area is 990.9 km2. Its population was 66,478 in 2018, of which 9,151 in Redon proper.

History
In 1996 the Communauté de communes du Pays de Redon was created.
Since 1st January 2018, the intercommunality has become an Agglomeration Community. It is made up of 31 communes: 11 communes are in the Morbihan, 12 in the Ille-et-Vilaine and 8 in the Loire-Atlantique.

Participants 

The intercommunality comprises the following 31 communes:

Allaire, Morbihan
Avessac
Bains-sur-Oust
Béganne
Bruc-sur-Aff
La Chapelle-de-Brain
Conquereuil
Fégréac
Les Fougerêts
Guémené-Penfao
Langon, Ille-et-Vilaine
Lieuron
Massérac
Peillac
Pierric
Pipriac
Plessé
Renac
 Redon (seat)
Rieux, Morbihan
Saint-Ganton
Saint-Gorgon, Morbihan
Saint-Jacut-les-Pins
Saint-Jean-la-Poterie
Saint-Just, Ille-et-Vilaine
Sainte-Marie, Ille-et-Vilaine
Saint-Nicolas-de-Redon
Saint-Perreux
Saint-Vincent-sur-Oust
Sixt-sur-Aff
Théhillac

Competences
Redon Agglomération is in charge of a dozen competences:
Tourism 
Marinas and commercial ports
Waste collection and treatment
Creation, development, maintenance and management of industrial, commercial and craft business parks
Creation, development and maintenance of roads of community interest
Economic development
Integration through economic activity
Development of ICTs
School transport
Sociocultural and cultural activities: theatre, media library, conservatory, outdoor activities, swimming pools...

References 

Intercommunalities of Morbihan
Intercommunalities of Ille-et-Vilaine
Agglomeration communities in France
Intercommunalities of Loire-Atlantique